An architectural style is a set of characteristics and features that make a building or other structure notable or historically identifiable. It is a sub-class of style in the visual arts generally, and most styles in architecture relate closely to a wider contemporary artistic style. A style may include such elements as form, method of construction, building materials, and regional character. Most architecture can be classified within a chronology of styles which changes over time, reflecting changing fashions, beliefs and religions, or the emergence of new ideas, technology, or materials which make new styles possible.

Styles therefore emerge from the history of a society. They are documented in the subject of architectural history. At any time several styles may be fashionable, and when a style changes it usually does so gradually, as architects learn and adapt to new ideas. The new style is sometimes only a rebellion against an existing style, such as post-modernism (meaning "after modernism"), which in 21st century has found its own language and split into a number of styles which have acquired other names.

Architectural styles often spread to other places, so that the style at its source continues to develop in new ways while other countries follow with their own twist. For instance, Renaissance ideas emerged in Italy around 1425 and spread to all of Europe over the next 200 years, with the French, German, English, and Spanish Renaissances showing recognisably the same style, but with unique characteristics. An architectural style may also spread through colonialism, either by foreign colonies learning from their home country, or by settlers moving to a new land. One example is the Spanish missions in California, brought by Spanish priests in the late 18th century and built in a unique style.

After an architectural style has gone out of fashion, revivals and re-interpretations may occur. For instance, classicism has been revived many times and found new life as neoclassicism. Each time it is revived, it is different. The Spanish mission style was revived 100 years later as the Mission Revival, and that soon evolved into the Spanish Colonial Revival.

Vernacular architecture is listed separately.   As vernacular architecture is better understood as suggestive of culture, writ broadly (as well as a theory and a process rather than a thing-in-itself), it technically can encompass every architectural style--or none at all. In and of itself, vernacular architecture is not a style.

History of the concept of architectural style 

Constructing schemes of the period styles of historic art and architecture was a major concern of 19th century scholars in the new and initially mostly German-speaking field of art history. Important writers on the broad theory of style including Carl Friedrich von Rumohr, Gottfried Semper, and Alois Riegl in his Stilfragen of 1893, with Heinrich Wölfflin and Paul Frankl continued the debate into the 20th century. Paul Jacobsthal and Josef Strzygowski are among the art historians who followed Riegl in proposing grand schemes tracing the transmission of elements of styles across great ranges in time and space. This type of art history is also known as formalism, or the study of forms or shapes in art.

Semper, Wölfflin, and Frankl, and later Ackerman, had backgrounds in the history of architecture, and like many other terms for period styles, "Romanesque" and "Gothic" were initially coined to describe architectural styles, where major changes between styles can be clearer and more easy to define, not least because style in architecture is easier to replicate by following a set of rules than style in figurative art such as painting. Terms originated to describe architectural periods were often subsequently applied to other areas of the visual arts, and then more widely still to music, literature and the general culture.  In architecture stylistic change often follows, and is made possible by, the discovery of new techniques or materials, from the Gothic rib vault to modern metal and reinforced concrete construction. A major area of debate in both art history and archaeology has been the extent to which stylistic change in other fields like painting or pottery is also a response to new technical possibilities, or has its own impetus to develop (the kunstwollen of Riegl), or changes in response to social and economic factors affecting patronage and the conditions of the artist, as current thinking tends to emphasize, using less rigid versions of Marxist art history.

Although style was well-established as a central component of art historical analysis, seeing it as the over-riding factor in art history had fallen out of fashion by World War II, as other ways of looking at art were developing, and a reaction against the emphasis on style developing; for Svetlana Alpers, "the normal invocation of style in art history is a depressing affair indeed". According to James Elkins "In the later 20th century criticisms of style were aimed at further reducing the Hegelian elements of the concept while retaining it in a form that could be more easily controlled".

Mannerism 

While many architectural styles explore harmonious ideals, Mannerism wants to take style a step further and explores the aesthetics of hyperbole and exaggeration. Mannerism is notable for its intellectual sophistication as well as its artificial (as opposed to naturalistic) qualities.  Mannerism favours compositional tension and instability rather than balance and clarity. The definition of Mannerism, and the phases within it, continues to be the subject of debate among art historians.

An example of Mannerist architecture is the Villa Farnese at Caprarola in the rugged country side outside of Rome. The proliferation of engravers during the 16th century spread Mannerist styles more quickly than any previous styles. A centre of Mannerist design was Antwerp during its 16th-century boom. Through Antwerp, Renaissance and Mannerist styles were widely introduced in England, Germany, and northern and eastern Europe in general. Dense with ornaments of "Roman" detailing, the display doorway at Colditz Castle exemplifies this northern style, characteristically applied as an isolated "set piece" against unpretentious vernacular walling.
During the Mannerist Renaissance period, architects experimented with using architectural forms to emphasize solid and spatial relationships. 

The Renaissance ideal of harmony gave way to freer and more imaginative rhythms. The best known architect associated with the Mannerist style was Michelangelo (1475–1564), who is credited with inventing the giant order, a large pilaster that stretches from the bottom to the top of a façade. He used this in his design for the Campidoglio in Rome.

Prior to the 20th century, the term Mannerism had negative connotations, but it is now used to describe the historical period in more general non-judgmental terms.

See also 

Historicism (architecture)
History of architecture
List of architectural styles
Revivalism (architecture)

Notes

References 
"Alpers in Lang": Alpers, Svetlana, "Style is What You Make It", in The Concept of Style, ed. Berel Lang, (Ithaca: Cornell University Press, 1987), 137–162, google books. 
Elkins, James, "Style" in Grove Art Online, Oxford Art Online, Oxford University Press, accessed March 6, 2013, subscriber link
Elsner, Jas, "Style" in Critical Terms for Art History, Nelson, Robert S. and Shiff, Richard, 2nd Edn. 2010, University of Chicago Press, 9780226571690, google books
Gombrich, E. "Style" (1968), orig. International Encyclopedia of the Social Sciences, ed. D. L. Sills, xv (New York, 1968), reprinted in Preziosi, D. (ed.) The Art of Art History: A Critical Anthology (see below), whose page numbers are used.
"Kubler in Lang": Kubler, George, Towards a Reductive Theory of Style, in Lang
Lang, Berel (ed.), The Concept of Style, 1987, Ithaca: Cornell University Press, 9780801494390, google books; includes essays by Alpers and Kubler
Preziosi, D. (ed.) The Art of Art History: A Critical Anthology, Oxford: Oxford University Press, 1998,

External links
Architectural style – Portella

 
Architectural design
Architectural history